Bryn Arvon and Gwyn Arvon are two historic homes located at Arvonia, Buckingham County, Virginia. They were built about 1891–1892, and are two slate-covered Queen Anne style dwellings. Also on the property are a contributing garage, water tower, barn, two entrance piers, the site of a house foundation, a pump house, and a storage building.

The houses were listed on the National Register of Historic Places in 1991.

References

Houses on the National Register of Historic Places in Virginia
Queen Anne architecture in Virginia
Houses completed in 1892
Houses in Buckingham County, Virginia
National Register of Historic Places in Buckingham County, Virginia